Noel Sullivan (born 28 July 1980 as Noel John Hayes) is a Welsh singer and actor. He was a member of the British pop group Hear'Say. Like the other members of the group, he won his part through the talent show Popstars.

Early life
Sullivan grew up in Cardiff in a musical family with a strong choral background. He trained as a chorister, understudied for Welsh National Opera and performed in choirs. Aged 18, Sullivan toured the United States with The Black Mountain Male Chorus of Wales as a musical theatre soloist.

Career

2001-2002: Hear'say
Sullivan first rose to fame in 2001, when he appeared as an aspiring pop singer in the first series of the reality television documentary Popstars, which aired on the UK television channel ITV1. He impressed the show's expert judges (who included Nigel Lythgoe and Nicki Chapman) enough to win selection as a founder member of the pop group Hear'say, alongside Danny Foster, Myleene Klass, Kym Marsh and Suzanne Shaw.

After the formation of the group Sullivan gave up a part-time job as a waiter to move to London. Hear'say went on to enjoy international success, selling nearly three million records worldwide. The group's debut single "Pure and Simple" became the fastest selling number one single of the UK Singles Chart at the time. The group also released another UK number one single and a number one album, as well as performing a sell out arena tour across the UK and Ireland. The group disbanded 18 months later after four single and two album releases.

2003-2012
After the split of Hear'say, Sullivan turned to musical theatre, appearing in productions such as Fame, Love Shack and What a Feeling and performed at the Royal Gala opening of the Wales Millennium Centre. In 2003, Sullivan appeared in Grease as Danny Zuko opposite Claire Buckfield as Sandy and Amanda-Jane Manning as Rizzo at the Jersey Opera House In 2006, Sullivan briefly returned to reality television to star in Trust Me – I'm a Holiday Rep, broadcast on Five. Sullivan then moved to the United States for 18 months, working in Las Vegas hosting Simply Ballroom and then moving to Reno and Branson as part of the Twelve Irish Tenors. Starting in July 2008, Sullivan played the lead male role in the world premier production of Flashdance. From November 2009, he starred in the West End theatre production of Grease as the male lead, Danny.

Sullivan made a cameo appearance in Gavin & Stacey broadcast on BBC One on 1 January 2010. Sullivan sang with Jessica Cervi and Sarah O'Connor in the final of RTÉ One's Fame: The Musical in Dublin on 13 June 2010. Sullivan played the lead role of Galileo Figaro in the 2011 UK tour of We Will Rock You. Sullivan took over from Alex Gaumond in the lead role of Galileo in We Will Rock You in the West End Production of the musical at the Dominion Theatre. The role reunited Sullivan with his former Grease co-star, Lauren Samuels, who plays Scaramouche in the show.

2013-present
Beginning in May 2013, Sullivan shared the role of Tick/Mitzi with Jason Donovan in the UK tour of Priscilla, Queen of the Desert.

Sullivan played Freddy in the 2015/16 UK Tour of Dirty Rotten Scoundrels.

In 2016, Sullivan co-starred in the second series of the BBC drama Ordinary Lies. He starred in the UK premier of It’s Only Life at The Union Theatre in London, in 2018. In 2019, Sullivan featured in the BBC series Years and Years. That same year, Sullivan was a guest on Heston's Marvellous Menu: Back to the Noughties in which chef Heston Blumenthal recreated The Fat Duck restaurant as it was in 2001.

Sullivan appeared in BBC's Call the Midwife Christmas Special in 2021. A year later, he appeared in the BBC soap opera Doctors as Oscar Baxter.

Personal life
In 2017, to mark 50 years since the decriminalisation of homosexuality in Britain, Sullivan came out as gay on Instagram and announced that he had married his partner.

References

1980 births
21st-century Welsh male singers
Welsh gay actors
Welsh LGBT actors
Welsh LGBT musicians
British LGBT singers
Living people
Male actors from Cardiff
Singers from Cardiff
Welsh people of Irish descent
Welsh pop singers
20th-century Welsh LGBT people
21st-century Welsh LGBT people